"Hourglass / Theme from Harry's Game" is a double A-side single by Irish musical group Clannad. It was released in 1989 to promote their best-of Past Present. However, "Hourglass" does  not appear on the Past Present album.

This is the band's only double A-side single to date and was only available as a single until it was included on the 2-disc 1997 Netherlands compilation "In a Lifetime: The Ultimate Collection (BMG 74321 488072)" and then again on the 2020 compilation In a Lifetime.

Two promotional videos were produced to accompany the single, one for each of the lead songs, "Hourglass" directed by Tim Morris & Pól Brennan, and "Theme from Harry's Game" by Billy Magra.

Track listing
7" vinyl & cassette
 "Hourglass"
 "Theme from Harry's Game"

3" compact disc
 "Theme from Harry's Game"
 "Hourglass"

12" vinyl
 "Hourglass"
 "Theme from Harry's Game"
 "World of Difference"

5" compact disc
 "Hourglass"
 "Theme from Harry's Game"
 "World of Difference"
 "Journey's End"

References

1989 singles
Clannad songs
1989 songs
Songs written by Pól Brennan
RCA Records singles
Songs written by Ciarán Brennan